Edmond Dalrymple Hesketh Knox was a 19th century  Anglican priest in Ireland.

The son of Bishop Edmund Knox, he was born in County Down and  educated at Trinity College, Dublin. He held livings in  Upper Badoney; Rathronan and Kilflyn. He became Archdeacon of Killaloe in 1832. In 1858 a wills and administration document records him as a lunatic yet he is recorded in the 1868 Crockford's as still being Archdeacon.

References

Alumni of Trinity College Dublin
Church of Ireland priests
19th-century Irish Anglican priests
Archdeacons of Killaloe
People from County Down